The Ernst Reuter Prize (Ernst-Reuter-Preis) is a German national prize for audio plays (Hörspiel) and radio documentation about the divided Germany, named after Ernst Reuter. It was awarded from 1959 to 1991 by the Bundesministerium für innerdeutsche Beziehungen for audio plays and radio documentation, doted 10,000 DM dotiert. It was awarded to productions that dealt with relations of people from the two German nations ("Verhältnis der Menschen in den beiden deutschen Staaten zueinander").

Selected recipients 
 Wolfgang Menge (awarded twice, but years unknown)
 1963 Ingeborg Drewitz
 1966 
 1971 
 1978 Thomas Brasch
 1979 no award
 1982 Tilo Medek, Dorothea Medek
 1989 Helga M. Novak
 1990 Peter Gotthardt
 1991 Jens Sparschuh (1990 according to some sources)

References 

German literary awards
Radio awards
Awards established in 1959
Awards disestablished in 1991
1959 establishments in Germany
1991 disestablishments in Germany